"I Always Knew" is a single by English indie rock band the Vaccines. The track was released in the United Kingdom on 18 November 2012 as the third single from the band's second studio album, Come of Age (2012). It was also used in the season 2 finale of the hit US television show New Girl.

Track listing

Charts

Release history

References

2012 singles
The Vaccines songs
2012 songs
Columbia Records singles